Yúzhou or Yú Prefecture was a zhou (prefecture) in imperial China located in modern Chongqing, China. It existed (intermittently) from 581 to 1102, when its name was changed to Gong Prefecture.

Geography
The administrative region of Yu Prefecture in the Tang dynasty is in modern southwestern Chongqing. It probably includes parts of modern: 
Chongqing
Jiangjin District
Bishan District
Yongchuan District

References
 

Prefectures of the Sui dynasty
Prefectures of the Tang dynasty
Prefectures of the Song dynasty
Prefectures of Former Shu
Prefectures of Later Shu
Prefectures of Later Tang
Former prefectures in Chongqing